Periglypta is a genus of bivalves in the family Periplomatidae.

Species
 Periploma aleuticum (Krause, 1885) – Aleutian spoonclam
 Periploma andamanicum (E. A. Smith, 1904)
 Periploma beibuwanense F.-S. Xu, 1999
 Periploma camerunense Cosel, 1995
 Periploma carpenteri Dall, 1896
 Periploma compressum d'Orbigny, 1846
 Periploma coquettae van Regteren Altena, 1968
 Periploma discus Stearns, 1890 – round spoonclam
 Periploma fracturum Boshoff, 1968
 Periploma fragile (Totten, 1835) – fragile spoonclam
 Periploma hendrickxi Valentich-Scott & Coan, 2010
 Periploma indicum Melvill, 1898
 Periploma inequale (C. B. Adams, 1842)
 Periploma kaiserae Valentich-Scott & Coan, 2010
 Periploma lagartillum Olsson, 1961
 Periploma lenticulare G. B. Sowerby I, 1834
 † Periploma macphersoni Marwick, 1931 
 Periploma margaritaceum (Lamarck, 1801) – unequal spoonclam
 Periploma multigranosum F.-S. Xu, 1999
 Periploma nanshaense F.-S. Xu, 1999
 Periploma orbiculare Guppy, 1882  
 Periploma ovatum d'Orbigny, 1846
 Periploma papyratium (Say, 1822) – paper spoonclam
 Periploma planiusculum G. B. Sowerby I, 1834 – flat spoonclam
 Periploma praetenue (Pulteney, 1799)
 Periploma rosewateri F. R. Bernard, 1989
 Periploma sanctamarthaense Ardilla & Diaz, 1998
 Periploma skoglundae Valentich-Scott & Coan, 2010
 Periploma stearnsii Dall, 1896
 Periploma subfragilis Scarlato & Kafanov, 1988
 Periploma teevani Hertlein & A. M. Strong, 1946

Synonyms
Periploma abyssorum Verrill in Bush, 1893: synonym of Periploma aleuticum (A. Krause, 1885)
 Periploma affine A. E. Verrill and Bush, 1898 – related spoonclam : synonym of Cochlodesma affine (Verrill & Bush, 1898)
 Periploma alaskana Williams, 1940: synonym of Periploma aleuticum (A. Krause, 1885)  
 Periploma anguliferum (Philippi, 1847) – angled spoonclam: sdynonym of Periploma inequale (C. B. Adams, 1842)
 Periploma leanum (Conrad, 1831) – lea spoonclam, oval spoonclam: synonym of Cochlodesma leanum (Conrad, 1831)
 Periploma tenerum P. Fischer, 1882 – delicate spoonclam: synonym of Cochlodesma tenerum Fischer, 1882

References

 Schumacher, C. F. (1817). Essai d'un nouveau système des habitations des vers testacés. Schultz, Copenghagen. iv + 288 pp., 22 pls
 Coan, E. V.; Valentich-Scott, P. (2012). Bivalve seashells of tropical West America. Marine bivalve mollusks from Baja California to northern Peru. 2 vols, 1258 pp.
 Cosel, R. von, 1995. Fifty-one new species of marine bivalves from tropical West Africa. Iberus 13(1): 1-115

External links
 Schumacher, C. F. (1817). Essai d'un nouveau système des habitations des vers testacés. Schultz, Copenghagen. iv + 288 pp., 22 pls
 

Periplomatidae
Bivalve genera